Aghorekamini Prakashchandra Mahavidyalaya, also known as Bengai College, is a college in Bengai, in Hooghly district, India. It offers undergraduate courses in arts, commerce and sciences.  It is affiliated to  University of Burdwan. It was established in 1959.

Departments

Science
Chemistry
Physics
Mathematics
Botany
Zoology
Environmental Science
Nutrition

Arts and Commerce
Bengali
English
Sanskrit
History
Geography
Political Science
Philosophy
Education
Physical Education
Commerce
Mass Communication & Journalism
Sociology
Music
Economics

Accreditation
In 2006 it was accredited by the National Assessment and Accreditation Council (NAAC), and awarded B grade, an accreditation that has since then expired.

See also

References

External links
Aghorekamini Prakashchandra Mahavidyalaya

Colleges affiliated to University of Burdwan
Educational institutions established in 1959
Universities and colleges in Hooghly district
1959 establishments in West Bengal